Luca Wackermann (born 13 March 1992 in Rho) is an Italian cyclist, who last rode for UCI ProTeam . In October 2020, he was named in the startlist for the 2020 Giro d'Italia. However, at the end of stage 4, Wackermann was involved in a crash caused by a low-flying helicopter that blew some crash barriers into him. Wackermann suffered a broken nose and a suspected broken back in the incident.

Major results

2009
 1st  Road race, UEC European Junior Road Championships
2010
 3rd Road race, National Junior Road Championships
2012
 1st Trofeo Menci Spa
2015
 4th Gran Premio Industria e Commercio di Prato
2016
 1st  Overall Tour d'Oranie
1st Stages 2 & 3
 1st  Overall Tour International de Blida
1st Stages 1 & 3
 1st  Overall Tour Internationale d'Annaba
1st Stage 2
 1st Stage 4 Tour d'Azerbaïdjan
2018
 1st Stage 2 Tour du Limousin
 4th Coppa Ugo Agostoni
 9th Trofeo Matteotti
2019
 9th Overall Tour de Luxembourg
2020
 1st  Overall Tour de Limousin
1st Stage 1
 6th Overall Sibiu Cycling Tour

Grand Tour general classification results timeline

References

External links

1992 births
Living people
Italian male cyclists
Italian people of German descent
People from Rho, Lombardy
Cyclists from the Metropolitan City of Milan